O'Brien Trophy or O'Brien Award may refer to:

 O'Brien Trophy (ice hockey) or O'Brien Cup, a retired trophy that was awarded in the National Hockey Association and the National Hockey League from 1910 to 1950
 Larry O'Brien Championship Trophy, awarded annually to the National Basketball Association (NBA) Finals winner.
 Davey O'Brien Award, presented annually to the collegiate American football player adjudged to be the best of all National Collegiate Athletic Association quarterbacks.
 Lawrence O'Brien Award, presented to individuals and groups who exhibit a high degree of commitment and self-sacrifice on behalf of the U.S. Democratic Party.